is a Buddhist Zen temple in Kita-Kamakura, Kanagawa Prefecture, Japan. It belongs to the Engaku-ji school of the Rinzai sect and is ranked fourth among Kamakura's Five Mountains. The main objects of worship are the three statues of Shaka, Miroku and Amida Nyorai visible inside the main hall.

History
Officially, the temple was founded in 1283 by Hōjō Munemasa (1253–1281) (son of the fifth Shikken Hōjō Tokiyori) and his son Hōjō Morotoki (1275–1311). However, because the temple opened the year Munemasa died at just 29 and because of Morotoki's age at the time, it's likely that his wife and Munemasa's younger brother Hōjō Tokimune (1251–1284) had a hand in directing its building and its opening.

Priest Nanshu Kōkai (a.k.a. Shin’o Zenji) was invited to open the temple but, feeling too young and not up to the task, he asked the Hōjōs to nominate also Gottan Funei and Daikyu Shonen, both Chinese Zen masters that had come to Japan invited by Hōjō Tokiyori. The temple has therefore the distinction of having three official founding priests.

However, starting from the middle of the 15th century, the temple gradually fell into disrepair in line with the decline of the city of Kamakura itself, and although it maintained eight sub-temples until the end of the Edo period, most of the temple's structures were destroyed in the 1923 Great Kantō earthquake. The temple was rebuilt after the Showa era.

Points of interest

In her 1918 Kamakura: Fact and Legend, Iso Mutsu had little to say about Jōchi-ji, other than it was in complete decay. She dedicated to it just a half page. In fact, all you see today is new.

At its peak, the temple was far bigger than now; it comprised 11 buildings and 500 people lived in it, but little is left of the original great temple that was one of Kamakura's Five Mountains. All existing buildings were rebuilt after being lost during the Great Kantō earthquake.

At the entrance there are a pond, a stone bridge and a gate. Above the gate stand the four characters , or "The treasure you are looking for is next to you".

After a flight of stone stairs one finds a very unusual feature: the Shōrōmon (鐘楼門), that is a two-storied combination of shōrō (belfry) and rōmon (gate) restored in 2007. The second story holds a bell made in the year 1340.

In the main hall nearby are three images of Buddha (the already-mentioned Amida, Shaka, and Miroku), the main objects of worship, which guard respectively the past, the present and the future.

Behind the main hall are the graveyard, some bamboo groves, numerous cave graves (the so-called yagura), and the statue of Hotei, the god of good fortune or happiness. After having been touched by generations of Japanese wishing to improve their luck, his belly, his left earlobe and his index finger have been worn smooth.

The street that runs to the left of the front gate leads to the house behind the temple where movie director Yasujirō Ozu used to live in the 1950s. It's also the starting point of a 30-minute hiking trail that leads to the Zeniarai Benten Shrine.

The temple is very near Kita-Kamakura Station.

See also
 For an explanation of terms concerning Japanese Buddhism, Japanese Buddhist art, and Japanese Buddhist temple architecture, see the Glossary of Japanese Buddhism.

References
A Guide to Kamakura accessed on March 28, 2008
Kamakura Citizens Net, Kita-kamakura accessed on March 28, 2008
 

1280s establishments in Japan
1283 establishments in Asia
Buddhist temples in Kamakura, Kanagawa
Engaku-ji temples
Rinzai temples
13th-century Buddhist temples